Atanu Das (born 5 April 1992)  represents India in the recurve men's individual and team events. His current world ranking is 9 as of 22 July 2021. He is the spouse of World No. 1 Indian archer Deepika Kumari.

Career
Das started archery at the age of 14 under the coaching of Mithu Da. In 2008, he moved to Tata Archery Academy where he was trained under the Korean coach Lim Chae Wong. He made his international debut in 2008.

Das won the bronze medal, with Deepika Kumari, in the 2013 World Cup mixed team event organized in Colombia.

Deepika Kumari and Atanu Das beat Sjef van den Berg and Gabriela Schloesser of Netherlands and fetch India a third gold medal at the World Cup.

In the men's team event at the 2020 Summer Olympics, Atanu Das was a member of Team India, which got knocked out by Team South Korea in the quarter finals. However, in the Men's individual event, he managed to reach the Round of 8 after upsetting 3rd seed Oh Jin-hyek in the Round of 16. In this Atanu Das got praised from the Olympic Gold Medalist Oh Jin Hyek. Oh Jin Hyek said, “While it may appear to be an excuse, it is quite different from what it appears to be in a gust of wind,” Jin-hyek said. “Atanu is a great player. I wasn't any better than he was.” This is according to one article by Good Morning Mumbai website.

Personal life 
Atanu Das was born on 5 April 1992 in Baranagar, West Bengal, India. He did his education in Baranagar Narendranath Vidyamandir, Baranagar. He is employed with Bharat Petroleum Sports Promotion Board, Kolkata.

Atanu Das married Deepika Kumari on June 30, 2020, in Ranchi.

Other achievements 
  Recurve Men's Individual, Senior National Archery Championships, India 2014
  Recurve Men's Team, Asian Archery Grand Prix, Thailand, 2013. [with Rahul Banerjee and Binod Swansi]
  Recurve Mixed Team, Asian Archery Grand Prix, Thailand, 2013 [with Bombayla Devi Laishram].
  Recurve Men's Individual, Asian Archery Grand Prix, Thailand, 2013.
  Recurve Mixed Team, 3rd Asian Grand Prix, Dhaka, Bangladesh, 2011 [with Rimil Buriuly].
  Bronze Medalist, Recurve Men's Team, 3rd Asian Grand Prix, Dhaka, Bangladesh, 2011
  Recurve Men's Individual, 3rd Asian Grand Prix, Dhaka, Bangladesh, 2011
  Recurve Men's Team, 34th National Games, Jamshedpur, India 2011
  Recurve Men's Team, 31st Sahara Senior National Archery Championships, Vijaywada, India 2011
  Recurve Junior Men's Team Men, Youth World Championship, Poland 2011
  Recurve Boys' Team, 33rd Junior National Archery Championships, New Delhi, India 2010

References

External links
 

1992 births
Living people
Archers from Kolkata
Indian male archers
Archers at the 2010 Summer Youth Olympics
Archers at the 2016 Summer Olympics
Archers at the 2020 Summer Olympics
Olympic archers of India
Archers at the 2014 Asian Games
Archers at the 2018 Asian Games
Asian Games competitors for India
World Archery Championships medalists
Recipients of the Arjuna Award